Native New Yorker (2005) is the title of the 2006 Tribeca Film Festival Best Documentary Short   by Steve Bilich.

Filmed with a 1924 hand-crank Cine-Kodak camera, Shaman Trail Scout 'Coyote' takes a journey which transcends time, from Inwood Park (where the island was traded for beads and booze), down a native trail (now 'Broadway'), into lower Manhattan (sacred burial ground, now including the newest natives of this island empire).

Shot before, during and after the September 11 attacks, 'Native New Yorker' took several years of filming, with a running length of 13 minutes. This is a film by Steve Bilich with an original score composed by William Susman.

New Internationalist calls 'Native New Yorker'   "...a conventionally unclassifiable short... In 13 minutes it brilliantly encapsulates aeons."

"...the stuff dreams - and nightmares - are made of." -The Austin Chronicle

In 2009, the film score to Native New Yorker was released on a CD entitled Music for Moving Pictures.

In 2011, the Tribeca Film Institute selected Native New Yorker for inclusion  in their Reframe Collection which "shares the best of our visual heritage."

In 2013, the Sound of Silent Film Festival screened Native New Yorker with a live orchestra
 at the Anthology Film Archives in New York City.

In 2014, The 50th Pesaro Film Festival in Pesaro Italy featured Native New Yorker in Panorama U.S.A. – Il cinema sperimentale-narrativo nel nuovo millennio

In 2015, The National Gallery of Art in Washington, D.C. featured Native New Yorker in a retrospective entitled "American Experiments in Narrative: 2000-2015"

Festivals

8th Athens Avant-Garde Film Festival - Athens, Greece
50th Pesaro Film Festival - Pesaro, Italy
Sound of Silent Film Festival - New York, NY
Native Spirit Film Festival - London, UK
Rooftop Film Festival - New York, NY
Cinestrat Film Festival - Alicante, Spain
Austin Jewish Film Festival - Austin,Texas
WILDsound Film Festival - Toronto, Canada
Sebastopol Documentary Film Festival - Lincoln, Nebraska
Moondance International Film Festival - Los Angeles, California
Expresion en Corto International Film Festival - Guanajuato, Mexico
Global Voices/UNAFF - Harvard Cambridge, Mass.
Tribeca Film Festival - New York, NY
Cinequest Film Festival - San Jose, California
Tiburon International Film Festival - Tiburon, California
Park City Film Music Festival - Park City, Utah
Raindance Film Festival - London, United Kingdom
United Nations Association Film Festival - Palo Alto, California
LA Shorts Fest - Los Angeles, California
Rome International Film Festival - Rome, Georgia
Vancouver International Film Festival Vancouver, Canada
Action/Cut Short Film Competition - Los Angeles, California
Avignon Film Festival - Avignon, France
Moondance International Film Festival - Boulder, Colorado

Awards

 Tribeca Film Festival - WINNER Best Documentary Short ( 2006)
 Park City Film Music Festival - WINNER Audience Choice – Best Impact of Music (2006)
 Park City Film Music Festival - WINNER Gold Medal Jury's Choice - Artistic Excellence (2006)
 Moondance International Film Festival - WINNER Columbine Award  (2005)

Broadcasts

 Aboriginal Peoples Television Network (APTN) (throughout Canada)
 PBS / WNET – Reel New York (New York)
 Comcast (throughout the United States)

References

External links
NativeNewYorkerFilm.com - Official Website
Alternative Film Guide - 2006 Tribeca Film Festival Awards
The Internet Movie Database - Native New Yorker (2005)
Awards Listing at IMDb - Native New Yorker Film Festival Awards
The TFI Reframe Collection - Tribeca Film Institute Online Portal for Independent Film
Channel Thirteen - PBS / WNET  - Reel New York Film Festival
Amazon.com - Available at Amazon in 2011
Film Score at iTunes - Released on album entitled Music For Moving Pictures in 2009

2005 films
2000s avant-garde and experimental films
American short documentary films
American avant-garde and experimental films
2005 short documentary films
Music about the September 11 attacks
Films without speech
Anti-modernist films
Environmental films
Documentary films about Native Americans
Documentary films about the September 11 attacks
American independent films
Documentary films about New York City
2005 independent films
2000s American films